Gérald Martinez (born 30 March 1955 in Montréjeau) is a retired French international rugby union  scrum half for Stade Toulousain.

Martinez made his international début for France in February 1982, against Wales, but would have to fight with Jerome Gallion, Jean-Pierre Élissalde but mostly Pierre Berbizier for the France number 9 shirt. .

Honours 
 French rugby champion finalist, 1980 with Stade Toulousain and 1987 with Racing Club de France
 Coupe de France 1984 with Stade Toulousain

External links
 ESPN profile

1955 births
Living people
French rugby union players
Rugby union scrum-halves
Stade Toulousain players
France international rugby union players